Troitsk is a former Russian Air Force base located near Troitsk, Chelyabinsk Oblast, Russia.

The base was home to the 385th Fighter Aviation Regiment between 1950 and 1971 with the Lavochkin La-9 (ASCC: Fritz), Mikoyan-Gurevich MiG-15 (ASCC: Fagot), Mikoyan-Gurevich MiG-17 (ASCC: Fresco) and the Sukhoi Su-9 (ASCC: Fishpot), and the 199th Independent Helicopter Squadron between 1991 and 2003 with the Mil Mi-6VPK (ASCC: Hook-B), Mil Mi-8T/PPA (ASCC: Hip-K) and the Mil Mi-24K/P (ASCC: Hind-F).

References

Russian Air Force bases